The Knight's Cross of the Iron Cross (German: Ritterkreuz des Eisernen Kreuzes) and its variants were the highest awards in the military of the Third Reich. Recipients are grouped by grades of the Knight's Cross. During or shortly after World War II, 318 German sailors and servicemen of the Kriegsmarine received the Knight's Cross of the Iron Cross. Of these, 316 presentations were formally made. Two recipients received the award after 11 May 1945, when Großadmiral Karl Dönitz ordered a cease of promotions and illegalized subsequent awards. The final two recipients are therefore considered to have received the medal without legal authority.

Background
The Knight's Cross of the Iron Cross and its higher grades were based on four separate enactments. The first enactment,  of 1 September 1939 instituted the Iron Cross, the Knight's Cross of the Iron Cross and the Grand Cross of the Iron Cross. Article 2 of the enactment mandated that the award of a higher class be preceded by the award of all preceding classes. As the war progressed, some of the recipients of the Knight's Cross distinguished themselves further and a higher grade, the Knight's Cross of the Iron Cross with Oak Leaves, was instituted. The Oak Leaves, as they were commonly referred to, were based on the enactment  of 3 June 1940. In 1941, two higher grades of the Knight's Cross were instituted. The enactment  of 28 September 1941 introduced the Knight's Cross of the Iron Cross with Oak Leaves and Swords and the Knight's Cross of the Iron Cross with Oak Leaves, Swords and Diamonds. At the end of 1944 the final grade, the Knight's Cross of the Iron Cross with Golden Oak Leaves, Swords, and Diamonds, based on the enactment  of 29 December 1944, became the final variant of the Knight's Cross authorized.

Recipients
The Oberkommando der Wehrmacht kept separate Knight's Cross lists, one for each of the three military branches, Heer (Army), Kriegsmarine (Navy), Luftwaffe (Air force) and for the Waffen-SS. In each of these lists a unique sequential number was assigned to each recipient. The same numbering paradigm was applied to the higher grades of the Knight's Cross, one list per grade.

Knight's Cross with Oak Leaves, Swords and Diamonds
The Knight's Cross with Oak Leaves, Swords and Diamonds is based on the enactment Reichsgesetzblatt I S. 613 of 28 September 1941 to reward those servicemen who had already been awarded the Oak Leaves with Swords to the Knight's Cross of the Iron Cross. It was awarded to twenty-seven German soldiers, sailors and airmen, ranging from young fighter pilots to field marshals. Two recipients were members of the Kriegsmarine. The list is initially sorted by the chronological number assigned to the recipient.

Knight's Cross with Oak Leaves and Swords
The Knight's Cross with Oak Leaves and Swords is also based on the enactment Reichsgesetzblatt I S. 613 of 28 September 1941 to reward those servicemen who had already been awarded the Oak Leaves to the Knight's Cross of the Iron Cross. The list is initially sorted by the chronological number assigned to the recipient.

Knight's Cross with Oak Leaves
The Knight's Cross with Oak Leaves was based on the enactment Reichsgesetzblatt I S. 849 of 3 June 1940. The last officially announced number for the Oak Leaves was 843. Higher numbers are unofficial and therefore denoted in brackets. The list is initially sorted by the chronological number assigned to the recipient.

Knight's Cross of the Iron Cross
The Knight's Cross of the Iron Cross is based on the enactment Reichsgesetzblatt I S. 1573 of 1 September 1939 Verordnung über die Erneuerung des Eisernen Kreuzes (Regulation of the renewing of the Iron Cross). The list is initially sorted by the chronological number assigned to the recipient.

Legally disputed Knight's Cross recipients
Großadmiral Karl Dönitz ordered a cease of all promotions and awards as of 11 May 1945. Nevertheless, a number of Knight's Crosses were awarded after this without legal authority. At least two members of the Kriegsmarine are often listed as recipients of the Knight's Cross but fall outside of the Dönitz decree. The Oberbefehlshaber der Kriegsmarine General-Admiral Walter Warzecha, successor of General-Admiral Hans-Georg von Friedeburg, without authorization presented Georg-Wolfgang Feller the Knight's Cross on 17 June 1945. Karl Jäckel received his Knight's Cross confirmation after 11 May 1945 and is a de facto but not de jure recipient. Both recipients were delisted by the Association of Knight's Cross Recipients (AKCR).

Footnotes

References
Specific

General

 
 
 
 Kurowski, Franz (1995). Knight's Cross Holders of the U-Boat Service. Schiffer Publishing Ltd. .
Kurowski, Franz (2007). Korvettenkapitän Werner Töniges Der erste Eichenlaubträger der Schnellbootwaffe (in German). Flechsig Verlag. .

External links
 
 

Lists of Knight's Cross of the Iron Cross recipients